"She Hates Me", originally (and still occasionally) titled "She Fucking Hates Me", is a song by American rock band Puddle of Mudd. It was written in 1993 but remained unreleased until 2002, when it became the fourth and final single from the band's debut album Come Clean.

The song continued the group's popularity on the Billboard Hot 100, peaking at No. 13, though not as successful as the number-five hit "Blurry". It also topped the Billboard Hot Mainstream Rock Tracks chart for one week in October. The popularity of "She Hates Me" made it become Puddle of Mudd's second single to sell over 500,000 copies in the United States, following "Blurry". The song also reached the top 10 in Australia, Austria, and Ireland while peaking at No. 14 on the UK Singles Chart, making it the group's third top 20 hit. It won a 2004 ASCAP Pop Music Award.

Composition
Puddle of Mudd lead guitarist Jimmy Allen had just ended a relationship and was inspired to write a song to reflect his ex-girlfriend's anger. The song ironically combines upbeat music with lyrics about the break-up. The chord progression is similar to the main chord progression in the 1983 Suicidal Tendencies song "I Saw Your Mommy", which had led to accusations that Puddle of Mudd plagiarized the song. It also shares chords and melodies with the song "Summer Nights" from the 1971 musical Grease, and the band has sometimes performed "She Hates Me" as a medley with that song during their concerts.

In the album's insert is a photocopy of each song's original handwritten lyrics, which displays the original name of the song as "She Fucking Hates Me". The title was changed to make it more acceptable to the public, though the line is still heard in its original form in the unedited version of the song.

Music video
The music video was directed by Marc Webb. It features members of the band playing a group of characters who all lip sync to the song, such as a high school student, a janitor, and a fast food cook. This is interspersed with shots of the band playing the song in the street. As the song gets louder and more distorted, the characters get more aggressive and violent towards those around them.

Track listings

UK CD1
 "She Hates Me" (explicit) – 3:36
 "Nobody Told Me" (live) – 5:40
 "Blurry" (live) – 5:02
 "She Hates Me" (video)

UK CD2
 "She Hates Me" (album version) – 3:36
 "Nobody Told Me" (acoustic live) – 5:04
 "Blurry" (acoustic live) – 4:11

UK cassette single
 "She Hates Me" (clean version)
 "Nobody Told Me" (live version)

European CD single
 "She Hates Me" (album version)
 "Nobody Told Me" (live from Pittsburgh)

Australian CD single
 "She Hates Me" (album version)
 "Nobody Told Me" (live from Pittsburgh)
 "Blurry" (live from Pittsburgh)

Charts

Weekly charts

Year-end charts

Certifications

Release history

References

External links
 

2001 songs
2002 singles
Geffen Records singles
Music videos directed by Marc Webb
Puddle of Mudd songs
Songs written by Jimmy Allen (musician)
Songs written by Wes Scantlin